Trifolium wormskioldii is a species of clover native to the western half of North America. Its common names include cows clover, coast clover, sand clover, seaside clover, springbank clover, and Wormskjold's clover.

Description
Trifolium wormskioldii, a legume, is a perennial herb sometimes taking a matlike form, with decumbent or upright stems. The lower stipules are tipped with bristles and the upper stipules may be toothed.

The sepals are bristle-tipped. The corollas are pinkish purple or magenta with white tips.

Etymology
The species was given its scientific name in honour of the Danish botanist Morten Wormskjold.

Distribution and habitat
This plant is native to the western half of North America from Alaska, through California, to Mexico.

Habitats it grows in include chaparral, oak woodland, grassland, yellow pine forest, red fir forest, lodgepole forest, subalpine forest, and wetland−riparian.

Uses
Many Native American groups of western North America use this clover for food. The herbage and flowers are eaten raw, sometimes salted. The roots are commonly steamed or boiled and eaten with fish, fish eggs, and fish grease.

This species is host to the caterpillar of the Western cloudywing butterfly (Thorybes diversus).

References

External links

Calflora Database: Trifolium wormskioldii (Coast clover, Cow clover, Springbank clover)
Jepson Manual eFlora (TJM2) treatment of Trifolium wormskioldii 
USDA Plants Profile: Trifolium wormskioldii (cows clover)
 UC CalPhotos gallery: Trifolium wormskioldii

wormskioldii
Flora of the Northwestern United States
Flora of the Southwestern United States
Flora of Northeastern Mexico
Flora of Northwestern Mexico
Flora of Alaska
Flora of British Columbia
Flora of California
Flora of New Mexico
Flora of Texas
Flora of the Sierra Nevada (United States)
Natural history of the California chaparral and woodlands
Natural history of the California Coast Ranges
Natural history of the Peninsular Ranges
Natural history of the Transverse Ranges
Plants used in Native American cuisine